Polaris  (formerly Toronto Trek) was an annual science fiction and fantasy convention held in Toronto, Ontario, Canada and in Richmond Hill, Ontario, Canada.

It began in 1986 as a relaxacon as Toronto Trek Celebration.  Two years later, in 1988, Toronto Trek Celebration 2 took place.  In 1989 it dropped the word "Celebration" and became simply "Toronto Trek".  For its twenty-first convention in 2007, the name was changed to "Polaris". At Polaris 26, held July 5–7, 2012, it was announced Polaris had come to an end and that a new convention would replace Polaris in 2013.  The convention went from +5,000 weekend memberships (at one event --it never had that amount ever before or again) and mostly hovered between 1200 to 1700 members.  The board felt extreme pressure due to rapid expansion of for profit events, and looked at various options, including running a Doctor Who event for the 50th Anniversary of Doctor Who, called Reversed Polarity.  Increased hotel space costs and actor guests wanting larger audiences to make more money from autographs led the Board to realize the convention model as it stood was no longer viable.  The not-for profit corporation still exists and could run events at any time.  However, COVID-19 has also made the board reconsider running events.

The convention had a focus on media guests from science fiction, fantasy movies and television series and novel authors such as Star Trek, Babylon 5, Stargate, Doctor Who, Buffy the Vampire Slayer, Jericho, Lost and Battlestar Galactica. Photo opportunities, autographs and Question & Answer sessions feature the media guest, who sometimes come to other programming and after hours events.

Polaris was one of several activities run by the TCON Promotional Society by means of a convention committee of more than 100 people grouped into 38 individual teams, each taking care of a different part of the convention. The TCON Promotional Society has coordinated other events, such as the Canadian Conrunners Conference in 2004, Their other current project is the Constellation Awards, a fan-nominated, fan-voted set of Science Fiction Awards with focus on film and television science fiction.  TCON hosted events are proposed to the TCON Board of Directors and voted upon by said Board.  The TCON Promotional Society is a not-for-profit corporation based out of Toronto, Ontario, Canada.

History

2010s

Polaris 26

July 6–8, 2012 · Sheraton Parkway Toronto North
 Wil Wheaton - Actor: Star Trek The Next Generation; Big Bang Theory
 Miracle Laurie - Actor: Dollhouse (replacing Dichen Lachman due to illness)
 Tony Amendola - Actor: Stargate SG1, Once Upon A Time
 Neil Grayston - Actor: Eureka, Wonderfalls, Warehouse 13
 Robert O'Reilly - Actor: Star Trek: TNG & DS9
 J. G. Hertzler - Actor: Star Trek: DS9
This was the last Polaris held.

Polaris 25

July 15–17, 2011 · Sheraton Parkway Toronto North
 Ben Browder - Actor: Farscape; Stargate SG-1
 Armin Shimerman - Actor: Star Trek Deep Space Nine; Buffy the Vampire Slayer
 Adam Baldwin - Actor: Full Metal Jacket; Firefly and Serenity; Chuck
 Meaghan Rath - Actor: Being Human
 Melinda Clarke - Actor: Nikita, C.S.I., Vampire Diaries, Firefly, Return of the Living Dead III, Reaper, Xena
 Charlaine Harris - Author Guest of Honour: Sookie Stackhouse Novels that the HBO True Blood series is based on.
 Brandon Sanderson - Author Guest of Honour: The Way of the Kings and was also chosen by Robert Jordan's widow to complete The Wheel of Time Series.
(more to come)

Polaris 24
July 16–18, 2010 · Sheraton Parkway Toronto North
  Robin Dunne - Actor: Sanctuary
  Alaina Huffman - Actor: Stargate Universe
  Kai Owen - Actor: Torchwood
  Ethan Phillips - Actor: Star Trek - Voyager
  Mark Sheppard - Actor: Battlestar Galactica
  Lindsay Wagner - Actor: Bionic Woman
  Robert J. Sawyer - Special Guest: Author
  Kelley Armstrong - Author Guest of Honour
 Author Guest: Stephanie Bedwell-Grime, Erik Buchanan, Eric Choi, John Robert Colombo, Julie E. Czerneda, Karen Dales, Gemma Files, Urania Fung, James Alan Gardner, Alyxandra Harvey, Matthew LeDrew, Derwin Mak, Violette Malan, David Nickle, Tony Pi, Michelle Rowen, Karl Schroeder, Douglas Smith, Dr. Robert Smith?, Rob St.Martin, Nikki Stafford, Kenneth Tam and Peter Watts

References

External links
 Official site

Events in Toronto
Defunct science fiction conventions
Defunct fantasy conventions
1986 establishments in Ontario
2012 disestablishments in Ontario
Recurring events established in 1986
Recurring events disestablished in 2012